Safeco Plaza may refer to:

 1001 Fourth Avenue Plaza, Seattle, Washington 
 UW Tower, Seattle, Washington